PGAM family member 5 (PGAM5), also known as mitochondrial Serine/threonine-protein phosphatase PGAM5 is related to phosphoglycerate mutase family. It, in humans, is encoded by the PGAM5 gene on chromosome 12.

References

External links 
 PDBe-KB provides an overview of all the structure information available in the PDB for Human Serine/threonine-protein phosphatase PGAM5, mitochondrial

Genes on human chromosome 12